NGC 1142 (also known as NGC 1144) is a distorted spiral galaxy in the constellation of Cetus. It is located about 370 million light years away from Earth, which means, given its apparent dimensions, that NGC 1142 is approximately 170,000 light years across. It is a type 2 Seyfert galaxy. It interacts with the elliptical galaxy NGC 1141.

It was discovered by Albert Marth on October 5, 1864, who noted a location 40 arcminutes north of the real location, and it was discovered independently on November 17, 1876, by Édouard Stephan.

Characteristics 
NGC 1142 is a spiral galaxy which interacts with the elliptical galaxy NGC 1141. The linear separation of the two galaxies is 40 arcseconds, which corresponds to about 20 kiloparsecs at the distance of NGC 1142. The closest encounter took place 22 million years before the observed moment and created a density wave across NGC 1142, which resulted in the formation of knots of gas and stars, and led to the distortion of the spiral galaxy, creating a knotty loop or ring that extends towards NGC 1141 and an off-centre nucleus. A stellar bridge connects the two galaxies.

Much of the mid-infrared emission originates from a massive extra-nuclear star formation region. Very large star clusters, categorised as super star clusters, have been formed in the loops, as a result of the increased gas density created by the density waves of the impact.

The gas dynamics in the galaxy are characterised by the very large velocity range, which is up to 1,100 m/s for the CO emission. NGC 1142 is one of the most luminous galaxies in the local universe as far as CO emission is concerned, twice as bright as the merger remnant Arp 220. Most of the emission originates from the ring, and especially its southern part, and a giant HII region west of the nucleus.

The nucleus of NGC 1142 has been found to be active and it has been categorised as a type II Seyfert galaxy. The most accepted theory for the energy source of active galactic nuclei is the presence of an accretion disk around a supermassive black hole. The mass of the black hole in the centre of NGC 1142 is estimated to be 10(8.40 ± 0.21) (155 - 410 million) .

See also 
 Eyes Galaxies - a similar pair of interacting galaxies

References

External links 

NGC 1142 on SIMBAD

Spiral galaxies
Ring galaxies
Peculiar galaxies
Seyfert galaxies
Luminous infrared galaxies
Interacting galaxies
Cetus (constellation)
Discoveries by Albert Marth
Astronomical objects discovered in 1864
1142
02389
11012
118
Markarian 1504